Cissus rotundifolia is a perennial, evergreen climber in the Vitaceae family.

Distribution
The species is native to eastern Africa and the Middle East, and has been introduced to India, Hawaii, and the Seychelles.

Cultivation and use
Cissus rotundifolia has been used in traditional medicine to treat burns, skin diseases, liver and gastrointestinal (GI) disorders.

References

rotundifolia
Taxa named by Martin Vahl